Chimo (also known as T4) was a young female orca exhibited in Sealand of the Pacific at The Oak Bay Marina in The Municipality of Oak Bay, British Columbia, Canada near the city of Victoria from 1970 to 1972. Chimo was notable for being the only partially albino orca ever exhibited in captivity.  Chimo was captured in an effort to find a mate for the park's star attraction, Haida. After her capture, Sealand became famous. Chimo's probable mother was another orca by the name of Scarredjaw Cow (T3), captured along with Chimo. Chimo died in 1972 from complications caused by Chédiak–Higashi syndrome, the syndrome which caused her albinism. Chimo never bore any calves. 

Years before her capture, another pure white orca was spotted in what is suspected to be the same pod; this orca, named "Alice", was never captured and vanished in the 1960s. 

In 2009, a fishing vessel off the Alaskan Peninsula spotted a healthy male killer whale who was almost completely white.

See also
Iceberg (orca)
Tilikum (orca)
List of individual cetaceans

References

Individual orcas
1972 animal deaths